Marco Polo House (originally stylised as "Marcopolo") was a large marble-effect, glass-clad office building and TV studio at 346 Queenstown Road, facing Battersea Park in the London Borough of Wandsworth. It was built in 1987–1988 and completed in 1989 by Peter Argyrou Associates, to a design by postmodernist architect and developer Ian Pollard through his property development company, Flaxyard, and initially used by British Satellite Broadcasting. The building was demolished in 2014.

Design
In the early 1990s, the building was described as "a high-tech glass cathedral", "palatial" and "architecturally magnificent" by the press, while traditionalists mocked its playfulness and postmodern opulence. After Postmodernism fell out of fashion, the building, like many of the style, began to divide opinion and be mocked by some critics.

The grey and white theme was echoed in silver birch trees which were planted in the forecourt of the Chelsea Bridge Business Centre/Observer offices side (the shorter side of the building). The two blocks were linked by a large, central glass atrium which featured iconic designer lifts and sanitation services.

The building is sometimes mistakenly described as "marble clad", but the white-and-grey cladding is Neoparium, a luxury Japanese crystallised glass-ceramic material. Pollard favoured Neoparium over marble due to its hard wearing qualities in extreme weather conditions. When Pollard discovered the material, it was added late in the project at a great expense, but as the building was marketed as a luxury, high-specification development, this was justified. The dark tinted glass panels were customised Pilkington glass.

It was originally home to British Satellite Broadcasting (BSB) television and is believed to have taken its name from its first owner's Marcopolo satellites, although there is a suggestion that the name was a playful reference to the broken pediment roof detailing, which Pollard supposedly said was similar to the "Mark of the Polo", referencing the sweet.

It is believed by many architecture critics that if the building had been allowed to stand for much longer, it would have been eligible for (and possibly have been granted) listed building status, which would have limited redevelopment options for developers capitalising on the Battersea Power Station and Nine Elms area regeneration in the late 2010s.

Use
Although typically referred to as 'Marco Polo House' or 'The QVC Building', Marcopolo was technically only one half of the building (the three-storey, taller side which was previously used as a television offices and studio). The other half of the adjoined structure was called originally to be called 'Chelsea Bridge Business Centre' and initially let to The Observer for its offices, although the Marcopolo name stuck.

The building cost £26 million to construct in 1987 (£61.9 million at 2014's rate) and was completed in 1989, at which time it was pre-let to BSB (who moved in during August 1989, fitted it out and officially launched in 1990) and The Observer. BSB promoted their move to the building in summer 1990 by sending customised Polo mints called 'Marcopolo - A Hole New Building' with their contact details on the wrapper instead of change-of-address cards to their PR contacts. The mints are on display at the National Media Museum.

The chippendale-style broken pediment is also featured on Philip Johnson's postmodern Sony Tower in New York. The Observer newspaper resided in the building until it was acquired by The Guardian and it moved to its offices in Farringdon Road. When BSB merged with Sky to form BSkyB the new company kept the lease, and in October 1993, the building became home to shopping channel QVC's studios and offices.

The smaller half of the building was also used as the offices for another ill-fated broadcaster, ONdigital, the UK's first digital terrestrial television broadcaster, from 1998. The company was re-launched in 2001 as ITV Digital who continued to use the ONdigital offices in the building until their subsequent demise in 2002.

Demolition
After a Russian consortium bought the freehold for more than £60m in 2006, QVC decided not to renew its lease when it expired in 2012, citing expansion as the need to move.

The channel looked for an alternative location – including in several cities in the North of England – for its 500 head office staff and studio centre. The channel's management ended broadcasting from the studios on 7 June 2012 and moved to  a new studio complex at Chiswick Business Park, in West London.

Press reports suggested that the architecturally and structurally sound Marco Polo House would be demolished, and replaced with a 12-storey luxury residential development, which was later revealed to be called Vista, designed by Scott Brownrigg. Marco Polo House's architect Pollard told the Architects' Journal the plan was a move towards a "lower grade of architecture", adding: "Marco was a fun building. It was quite an iconic at the time and some people still say it is." Other critics said it was "Postmodern nonsense". The Architects' Journals Merlin Fulcher told London's Evening Standard: "The new scheme looks decent, but it's always a shame to see an iconic structure knocked down, especially one that symbolises Eighties post-modernism so well."

The building was in a serviceable state and had not reached the end of its life. It was used by Crisis At Christmas (as The Gate) to house the homeless over the Christmas 2013 period. Although the property was still available to let in December 2013 and classed as "modern TV studios/offices" by estate agent The Lorenz Consultancy, hoardings advertising Berkeley's replacement 'Vista' development were in place in January 2014. It is assumed that by this time internal soft-stripping had started. 

By 8 March 2014, exterior demolition had begun. As of the end of April 2014, the entire 'Marcopolo' side had been demolished, with the central glass atrium being eroded from the central lift areas outward; demolition of the 'Chelsea Bridge' side then proceeded from the inside, leaving the exterior walls and an empty shell until last. Due to the low-rise nature of the building, the demolition was carried out using several Komatsu, Volvo and Hitachi high-reach excavators and breakers, meaning that the deconstruction of the building was visible to the public and passengers on train services to and from London Victoria passing the site. The demolition contractor was Laing O'Rourke. Its demolition left Homebase Kensington as the last iconic Ian Pollard postmodern structure in London which, as of 2019, has also been demolished.

Several former workers for the various companies which had resided at the building in its heyday, including journalist Jeremy Vine, expressed their sadness at the loss of the structure, with Vine calling it "symbolic" and stating that he was "amazed" that it had happened.

In media
The building was featured in the 2002 BBC Four documentary 'The Curse of Marco Polo House', 'Dreamspaces' (episode: '80s Architecture with Justine Frischmann) from BBC Three as well as the feature films 'Leon The Pig Farmer', 'The Business' and 'B. Monkey'.

The distinctive, teal designer glass lifts from the central adjoining atrium, which had been installed from Marcopolo's inception, were featured in some scenes of the 1993 Red Dwarf episode 'Legion'.

A video showing the interior during BSB days was included in the 'IBA Engineering Announcements - Tuesday April 26, 1990' ITV broadcast, which is (as of 2014) available to view on YouTube.

References

 Property Week – QVC signals end of Marcopolo House’s Battersea adventure

Buildings and structures completed in 1987
Office buildings in London
Buildings and structures in the London Borough of Wandsworth
Postmodern architecture in the United Kingdom
QVC
Buildings and structures demolished in 2014